The arrondissement of Vitry-le-François is an arrondissement of France in the Marne department in the Grand Est region. It has 110 communes.

Composition

The 110 communes of the arrondissement of Vitry-le-François, and their INSEE codes, are:
 
 Ablancourt (51001)
 Alliancelles (51006)
 Ambrières (51008)
 Arrigny (51016)
 Arzillières-Neuville (51017)
 Aulnay-l'Aître (51022)
 Bassu (51039)
 Bassuet (51040)
 Bettancourt-la-Longue (51057)
 Bignicourt-sur-Marne (51059)
 Bignicourt-sur-Saulx (51060)
 Blacy (51065)
 Blaise-sous-Arzillières (51066)
 Blesme (51068)
 Brandonvillers (51080)
 Bréban (51084)
 Brusson (51094)
 Le Buisson (51095)
 Bussy-le-Repos (51098)
 Changy (51122)
 Chapelaine (51125)
 Charmont (51130)
 Châtelraould-Saint-Louvent (51134)
 Châtillon-sur-Broué (51135)
 La Chaussée-sur-Marne (51141)
 Cheminon (51144)
 Cloyes-sur-Marne (51156)
 Coole (51167)
 Corbeil (51169)
 Courdemanges (51184)
 Couvrot (51195)
 Dompremy (51215)
 Drosnay (51219)
 Drouilly (51220)
 Écollemont (51223)
 Écriennes (51224)
 Étrepy (51240)
 Favresse (51246)
 Frignicourt (51262)
 Giffaumont-Champaubert (51269)
 Gigny-Bussy (51270)
 Glannes (51275)
 Haussignémont (51284)
 Hauteville (51286)
 Heiltz-le-Hutier (51288)
 Heiltz-le-Maurupt (51289)
 Heiltz-l'Évêque (51290)
 Huiron (51295)
 Humbauville (51296)
 Isle-sur-Marne (51300)
 Jussecourt-Minecourt (51311)
 Landricourt (51315)
 Larzicourt (51316)
 Lignon (51322)
 Lisse-en-Champagne (51325)
 Loisy-sur-Marne (51328)
 Luxémont-et-Villotte (51334)
 Maisons-en-Champagne (51340)
 Margerie-Hancourt (51349)
 Marolles (51352)
 Matignicourt-Goncourt (51356)
 Maurupt-le-Montois (51358)
 Le Meix-Tiercelin (51361)
 Merlaut (51363)
 Moncetz-l'Abbaye (51373)
 Norrois (51406)
 Orconte (51417)
 Outines (51419)
 Outrepont (51420)
 Pargny-sur-Saulx (51423)
 Plichancourt (51433)
 Ponthion (51441)
 Possesse (51442)
 Pringy (51446)
 Reims-la-Brûlée (51455)
 Les Rivières-Henruel (51463)
 Saint-Amand-sur-Fion (51472)
 Saint-Chéron (51475)
 Sainte-Marie-du-Lac-Nuisement (51277)
 Saint-Eulien (51478)
 Saint-Jean-devant-Possesse (51489)
 Saint-Lumier-en-Champagne (51496)
 Saint-Lumier-la-Populeuse (51497)
 Saint-Ouen-Domprot (51508)
 Saint-Quentin-les-Marais (51510)
 Saint-Remy-en-Bouzemont-Saint-Genest-et-Isson (51513)
 Saint-Utin (51520)
 Saint-Vrain (51521)
 Sapignicourt (51522)
 Scrupt (51528)
 Sermaize-les-Bains (51531)
 Sogny-en-l'Angle (51539)
 Sompuis (51550)
 Somsois (51551)
 Songy (51552)
 Soulanges (51557)
 Thiéblemont-Farémont (51567)
 Trois-Fontaines-l'Abbaye (51583)
 Val-de-Vière (51218)
 Vanault-le-Châtel (51589)
 Vanault-les-Dames (51590)
 Vauclerc (51598)
 Vavray-le-Grand (51601)
 Vavray-le-Petit (51602)
 Vernancourt (51608)
 Villers-le-Sec (51635)
 Vitry-en-Perthois (51647)
 Vitry-le-François (51649)
 Vouillers (51654)
 Vroil (51658)

History

The arrondissement of Vitry-le-François was created in 1800. At the April 2017 reorganisation of the arrondissements of Marne, it lost three communes to the arrondissement of Châlons-en-Champagne.

As a result of the reorganisation of the cantons of France which came into effect in 2015, the borders of the cantons are no longer related to the borders of the arrondissements. The six cantons of the arrondissement of Vitry-le-François were, as of January 2015:
 Heiltz-le-Maurupt
 Saint-Remy-en-Bouzemont-Saint-Genest-et-Isson
 Sompuis
 Thiéblemont-Farémont
 Vitry-le-François-Est
 Vitry-le-François-Ouest

References

Vitry-le-Francois